Jacob van Maerlant (c. 1230–40 – c. 1288–1300) was a Flemish poet of the 13th century and one of the most important Middle Dutch authors during the Middle Ages.

Biography

Jacob van Maerlant was born near Bruges. He became sacristan of Maerlant, in the island of Oostvoorne, where he lived for some time, employed as a sexton, whence his surname "de Coster". Later he resided at Damme, near Bruges, where, according to tradition, he held the position of town clerk.

His early works are Middle Dutch translations of French romances. Jacob's most serious work in the field of romance poems was his Historie van Troyen (c. 1264), a poem of some forty thousand lines, translated and amplified from the Roman de Troie of Benoît de Sainte-Maure.

From this time Jacob rejected romance as idle, and devoted himself to writing scientific and historical works for the education and, enlightenment of the Flemish and Dutch nobility. His Heimelicheit der Heimelicheden (c. 1266) is a translation of the Secreta secretorum, a manual for the education of princes, ascribed throughout the Middle Ages to Aristotle. Van der Naturen Bloeme is a free translation of De natura rerum, a natural history in twenty books by a native of Brabant, Thomas of Cantimpré; and his Rijmbijbel is taken, with many omissions and additions, from the Historia scholastica of Petrus Comestor. He supplemented this metrical paraphrase of scripture history by Die Wrake van Jherusalem (1271) by Josephus. He also translated a Life of St. Francis (Leven van St. Franciscus) from the Latin of Bonaventure. Jacob's most extensive work is the Spiegel Historiael, a rhymed chronicle of the world, translated, with omissions and important additions, from the Speculum historiale of Vincent de Beauvais. It is dedicated to Count Floris V and was begun in 1283, but was left unfinished at the poet's death. Continuations were given by Philip Utenbroeke and Lodewijc van Velthem, a Brabant priest. He wrote three Arthurian works: Torec, which survives in the massive Lancelot Compilation, and two romances based on the works of Robert de Boron: Historie van den Grale and Boec van Merline, which tell the stories of Joseph of Arimathea and Merlin.

Jacob is also the author of a number of strophic poems, which date from different periods of his life. Of these the best known is the Wapene Martijn ("Alas! Martin") so called from the opening words. It is a dialogue on the course of events held between the poet himself and a character named Martin. Altogether there are three parts, of which the above-mentioned is the first. The other two parts are known as Dander Martijn ("Second Martin") and Derden Martijn ("Third Martin").

Jacob's last poem Van den Lande van Oversee was written after the fall of Acre (1291) and is a stirring summons to a crusade against the infidels, with bitter complaints about abuses in the Church. The Geesten were edited by Franck (Groningen, 1882). Complete editions of the strophic poems were given by E. Verwijs (Groningen, 1880) and by J. Franck and J. Verdam (Groningen, 1898).

Based on doctoral research (Van Anrooij 1997), it is now thought likely that Jacob was also the author of the hitherto anonymous Van neghen den besten ("On the Nine Worthies"). This would be his last work. It is one of the few works with European distribution whose source text was written in Middle Dutch. The work had a profound and lasting impact on the honor code of the Western European knightly elite.

Jacob died in the closing years of the 13th century. The greater part of his work consists of translations, but he also produced poems that prove him to have had real original poetic faculty. Among these are Die Clausule van der Bible, Der Kerken Clage, imitated from a Complainte of Rutebeuf, and the three dialogues entitled Martijn, in which the fundamental questions of theology and ethics were discussed.

Although Jacob was an orthodox Roman Catholic, he is said to have been called to account by the priests for translating the Bible into the vulgar tongue. In spite of his orthodoxy, Jacob was a keen satirist of the corruptions of the clergy. He was one of the most learned men of his age, and for two centuries was the most celebrated of Flemish poets.

Biographical Uncertainty

The date and year of his birth are unknown. Estimates range between 1230 and 1240, as his oldest work, Alexanders geesten (The Deeds of Alexander the Great), was likely written shortly after 1260. Jacob's place of birth and information regarding his parents are also unknown. His language was analyzed by the Dutch linguists Amand Berteloot and Evert van den Berg, who came to the conclusion that he learned to speak in the County of Flanders, somewhere south of the city of Bruges, Belgium.

Jacob's place and time of death is also unknown. Tradition holds that Jacob must have been alive in 1291, because he is considered to be the author of the poem Vanden lande van Overzee (On the Land across the Sea), which discusses the fall of the last Christian city in the Holy Land, Saint-Jean d'Acres. This poem, which survived in only one manuscript (UB Groningen, Ms. 405), has no name attached to it. None of the texts in this manuscript bears the name of its author. However, he has historically been seen as the author of this poem, particularly by Nineteenth-century Dutch scholars. This claim was based on a verse in the 19th and last stanza: "Ghi heren, dit is Jacobs vont,", meaning 'Gentlemen, this is Jacob's creation'. For the 19th century, this was more than enough proof that the poet could not have been anybody else than Jacob van Maerlant. This is most likely an unsound theory as Jacob only referred to himself as such in his early life. By the time it is purported he wrote this poem, he was just using his last name 'Maerlant'. A recent examination of this manuscript by historian Jos Biemans confirmed that it is unlikely he was the author of this poem.

Attributed works

Alexanders Geesten
Historie van den grale
Merlijns boeck
Istory van Troyen
Der naturen bloeme
Rijmbijbel
Spieghel historiael
Sinte Franciscus' Leven
Wapene Martijn
Tweede Martijn
Van der Drievoudecheide
Verkeerde Martijn
Der Kerken claghe
Van den lande van overzee
Heimelykheid der heimelykheden
Lapidarijs
Leven van Ste. Clara
Sompniariis'TorecVan neghen den bestenSee also

Dutch literature
Flemish literature

Bibliography
 Evert van den Berg, "Waar kwam Jacob van Maerlant vandaan?", in Amand Berteloot: Verslagen en mededelingen van de Koninklijke Academie voor Nederlandse taal- en letterkunde 1993, p. 30-77.
Jos Biesmans, 'Het Gronings-Zutphense Maerlant-handschrift. Over de noodzakelijkheid der handschriftenkunde', in: Queeste 3 (1996), p. 107-219.
Frits van Oostrom, Maerlants wereld. Amsterdam 1996.
Karina van Dalen-Oskam, Studies over Jacob van Maerlants Rijmbijbel. Hilversum 1997.
Ingrid Biesheuvel, Maerlants werk. Juweeltjes van zijn hand. Amsterdam 1998.
Willem Kuiper, 'Die Destructie van Jherusalem in handschrift en druk', in: Voortgang, jaarboek voor de neerlandistiek'' 25 (2007), p. 67-88.
Claudine A. Chavannes-Mazel, Maerlants Rijmbijbel in Museum Meermanno. De kracht van woorden, de pracht van beelden. Met vertalingen uit het Middelnederlands van het handschrift 10 B 21 door Karina van Dalen-Oskam en Willem Kuiper. Den Haag 2008.

References

External links
Repertorium van Eigennamen in Middelnederlandse Literaire Teksten (REMLT)
Page on Jacob van Maerlant at Project Laurens Janszoon Coster with electronic versions of a few of his works
Diplomatic transcription of MS 10 B 21 Museum Meermanno

13th-century births
1300 deaths
Writers of Arthurian literature
Chroniclers from the Holy Roman Empire
Flemish poets
Flemish writers (before 1830)
13th-century historians from the Holy Roman Empire
Middle Dutch writers
Writers from Bruges
People from Damme
People from Westvoorne
13th-century poets
13th-century people from the county of Flanders